Gara LaMarche (born August 26, 1954) is the president of the Democracy Alliance, a network of liberal donors who coordinate their political giving. LaMarche previously served as president and CEO of The Atlantic Philanthropies. Prior to joining the Atlantic Philanthropies, he served as vice president and director of U.S. programs for The Open Society Institute. In his tenure at the Atlantic Philanthropies, LaMarche led the foundation's shift to a social justice approach to grant-making.

Background 
LaMarche attended St. Bernard's, a small all-boys high school in Uncasville, Connecticut, before enrolling in Columbia College, from which he graduated in 1976. While at Columbia, LaMarche became the youngest member ever to serve on an ACLU policy committee.

Professional life 
From 1979-1984, LaMarche was the associate director of the ACLU's New York branch and was the executive director of the ACLU of Texas from 1984 to 1988.  From 1988 to 1990, LaMarche was director of the Freedom-to-Write Program of the PEN American Center, when PEN played a leading role in campaigns to lift Iran's fatwa against Salman Rushdie and controversy over arts funding in the United States. From 1990 to 1996, he was director of the Free Expression Project at the Open Society Institute, until he was named the director of U.S. programs.

While at the Atlantic Philanthropies, LaMarche was credited with improving communications and transparency at the foundation. The Atlantic Philanthropies have made grants totaling more than $4 billion since 1982, including a $25 million pledge to advocacy groups supporting U.S. health care reform between 2008-2010.

Affiliations and writing 
LaMarche is a columnist for The Huffington Post and The Nation, as well as a blogger in his own right. He has written a number of articles on human rights and is the editor of the 1996 anthology, Speech and Equality: Do We Really Have to Choose? LaMarche has taught at The New York University's Wagner School of Public Service and at the New School University and John Jay College.

LaMarche serves on the boards of the National Committee for Responsive Philanthropy, StoryCorps and The White House Project. He is on the Leadership Council of Hispanics in Philanthropy. He is the winner of the 2010 Hubert H. Humphrey Civil and Human Rights Award from the Leadership Conference on Civil and Human Rights and the Community Change Champion Award from the Center for Community Change.

Personal life 
LaMarche has two daughters and lives in New York City.

References

External links
 The Atlantic Philanthropies official biography
 NYU Robert Wagner Graduate School of Public Service biography
 “Gara LaMarche 76’s Job is To Give Away $4 Billion,” Columbia College Today, May/June 2008
 Archive at Huffington Post
 “The Key Role of Advocacy Funding in the U.S. Health Care Debate”, Keynote, Grantmakers in Health Conference, March 11, 2010.

1954 births
Living people
People from Washington County, Rhode Island
American nonprofit executives
Columbia College (New York) alumni
American human rights activists
American philanthropists
HuffPost writers and columnists